Beate Gütschow (born 1970 in Mainz, Germany) is a contemporary German artist. She lives and works in Cologne and Berlin.

Life and work
Gütschow studied art at the University of Fine Arts of Hamburg from 1993 to 2000, and at the Oslo National Academy of the Arts in 1997.

She served as guest professor from 2009-2010 at the Academy of Visual Arts in Leipzig. Since 2011 she is a professor at the Academy of Media Arts Cologne.

Gütschow's work explores the relationship between photographic representation and reality. It also investigates how our visual perception is informed and influenced by prior knowledge of other images.

LS Series
In her first series, "LS" (an abbreviation of Landschaft, or landscape) Gütschow uses photographic means to reconstruct depictions of landscape in 17th- and 18th-century paintings. With the aid of computer software, she montages scores of image fragments to create photographs that adhere to the compositional principles of the ideal landscape.

S Series
The body of work entitled "S" for Stadt (city) consists of large black-and-white photographs that are also composed of multiple images. Diverse architectural structures and geographical locations are combined within a single picture. These works clearly reference documentary photography, but at the same time contradict it with their photographic fictions.

I Series
In the series "I" (for Interior), Gütschow undertakes a critical investigation of advertising photography, composing mundane objects such as a car battery, ergonomic chair, and overhead projector into surrealistic scenes in her studio.

Z Series
In this documentary series Gütschow combines photographic fragments with computer-generated drawings. Z stands for "Zellengefängnis". "Zellengefängnis" is the german translation for a former solitary confinement prison in Berlin. Gütschow has taken photo fragments from this location and processed it together with archive material in digital drawings.

HC Series
In her latest series „HC“ Gütschow deals with the pictorial representation of gardens in medieval and early Renaissance art. HC stands for Hortus Conclusus.

Gütschow takes motifs from contemporary architecture surroundings and transfers them to a parallel perspective with the help of photogrammetry. She uses this historical reference as a tool not only to challenge the viewer’s perception but also to negotiate current developments in 3D photography.

Gütschow has received numerous awards, including the ars viva prize awarded by the Kulturkreis der deutschen Wirtschaft (2006) and the Otto-Dix-Prize/IBM Art Award for New Media, Gera (2001). In 2001 she also held a fellowship at Villa Aurora in Los Angeles.

Gütschow was one of the urbanites portrayed in the 2009 documentary In Berlin by Michael Ballhaus and Ciro Cappellari.

Solo exhibitions (select)
 
2018 Produzentengalerie, Hamburg
2017 O+O Depot, Berlin 
2011 Fotogalleriet, Oslo
2011 St Paul St Gallery, Auckland, New Zealand
2011 ph-projecs, Berlin
2010 Galerie Barbara Gross, Munich
2010 Produzentengalerie, Hamburg
2009 Kunsthalle im Lipsiusbau, Staatliche Kunstsammlungen Dresden
2009 Sonnabend Gallery, New York
2008 Kunsthalle Nürnberg, Nuremberg
2008 Haus am Waldsee, Berlin
2007 Museum of Contemporary Photography, Chicago
2007 ArtSway, Hampshire, UK
2005 Produzentengalerie, Hamburg
2004 Galerie Barbara Gross, Munich
2004 Danziger Projects, New York

Works in public collections (selected)
Works of Beate Gütschow can be found in the collections of the Solomon R. Guggenheim Museum, Kunsthalle Hamburg, Los Angeles County Museum of Art, Kunsthaus Zurich, Pinakothek der Moderne in Munich, Metropolitan Museum of Art, Saint Louis Art Museum, San Francisco Museum of Modern Art, Staatlichen Kunstsammlungen Dresden and in the Staedel Museum, Frankfurt.

Literature und sources
LAND_SCOPE. Edited by Ulrich Pohlmann, Christina Leber, Katharinner Zimmermann, Erec Gellautz, Munich, 2019. Exh. Cat. Stadtmuseum München. Munich, 2019, pp. 20-27.
Fiction and Fabrication. Edited by Pedro Gadanho, Munich, 2019. Exh. Cat. MAAT – Museum of Art, Architecture and Technology, Lisboa, 2019, pp. 146-149.
Architektur im Bild. Edited by Manuela Reissmann. Exh. cat. Kunsthaus Zürich. Zurich, 2017, pp. 85.
Space. Edited by Stephan Barber and Michael Benson. Exh. cat. on the occasion of the Prix Pictet. London, 2017, pp. 73, 106-07.
The History Show. Edited by Uwe Fleckner and Bettina Steinbrügge. Reader Kunstverein Hamburg. Hamburg, pp. 28–37.
Florian Ebner, Anna-Catharina Gebbers, Maren Lübke Tidow, Friedrich Tietjen: Beate Gütschow: ZISLS. Heidelberg, 2016.
Gärten der Welt. Edited by Albert Lutz and Hans von Trotha. Exh. cat. Museum Rietberg Zurich. Cologne, 2016, p. 212.
Martin Engler and Max Hollein. Gegenwartskunst 1945 bis Heute im Städel Museum. Ostfildern, 2016, p. 335.
Imagine Reality. Edited by Ray Fotografieprojekte Frankfurt/RheinMain. Exh. cat. MMK Museum für moderne Kunst Frankfurt am Main, Museum für angewandte Kunst Frankfurt, Forum für Fotografie Frankfurt. Heidelberg and Berlin, 2015, pp. 44–47.
Radikal Modern. Edited by Thomas Köhler and Ursula Müller. Exh. cat. Berlinische Galerie Berlin. Tübingen and Berlin, 2015, pp. 194–95.
Ewing, William A. Landmark. The Fields of Landscape Photography. London, 2014, p. 226.
Concrete – Photography und Architecture. Janser, Daniela, Thomas Seelig and Urs Stahel, ed. Zurich 2013, p. 157.
Seduced By Art: Photography Past and Present. The National Gallery ed. London 2012, pp. 184.
Lost Places – Orte in der Photographie. Kunsthalle Hamburg, ed. Bielefeld, 2012, S. 44- 49, 140-141.
Malerei in der Fotografie. Strategien der Aneignung.Städel Museum, ed. Heidelberg 2012.
BELVEDERE – Warum ist Landschaft schön? Arp Museum Bahnhof Rolandseck, ed.  Bielefeld. 2011. (pp. 58–61)
Veto – Zeitgenössischen Positionen in der deutschen Fotografie. Deichtorhallen Hamburg, ed.  Heidelberg Berlin, 2011. (pp. 68–75)
XL Photography 4. Deutsche Börse AG, ed.  Ostfildern, 2011, (pp. 74–77)
WERT/SACHE. Gebbers, Anna-Catharina, ed. Exh. Cat. Moderne Kunst Nürnberg. Berlin, 2011. (pp. 15–16)
Felicità – Freude, Glück und Emotionen in der zeitgenössischen Kunst. Denaro, Dolores, ed. Exh. cat. CentrePasquArt. Biel, 2010, pp. 84–89.
Double Fantasy – Jan Jedlička, Michal Šeba, Beate Gütschow. Exh. cat. Galerie Rudolfinum. Prague, 2010, pp. 47–52, 96–109.
Realismus – Das Abenteuer der Wirklichkeit. Edited by Christiane Lange and Nils Ohlsen. Exh. cat. Kunsthalle Emden, Kunsthalle der Hypo-Kulturstiftung, Munich. Emden and Munich, 2010.
Oliver-Smith, Kerry. Project Europa: Imagining the (Im)possible. Exh. cat. Samuel P. Harn Museum of Art, University of Florida. Gainesville, 2010.
Unruh, Rainer. “Beate Gütschow: ‘I’.” Kunstforum International, no. 201 (March–April 2010), pp. 281–282.
Beate Gütschow: S. Exh. cat. Staatliche Kunstsammlungen Dresden. Ostfildern, 2009.
Gefter, Philip. Photography After Frank. New York, 2009.
Beate Gütschow LS / S. Edited by Lesley A. Martin. Exh. cat. Haus am Waldsee, Berlin. Cologne, 2008.
Lübbke-Tidow, Maren. "Aufführungen des Glücks und seiner Zerstörung." Kunst-Bulletin (March 2008), pp. 38–44.
Beate Gütschow LS / S. Edited by Lesley A. Martin. Exh. cat. Museum of Contemporary Photography, Chicago. New York, 2007.
Think with the Senses, Feel with the Mind: Art in the Present Tense, vol. 2. Edited by Harriet Bee and Robert Storr. Exh. cat. 52nd Biennale, Venice, 2007.
"Beate Gütschow." In Made in Germany. Edited by Martin Engler. Exh. cat. Kestnergesellschaft, Kunstverein Hannover, Sprengel Museum, Hanover. Ostfildern, 2007.
Reality Bites: Making Avant-garde Art in Post-Wall Germany / Kunst nach dem Mauerfall. Edited by Sabine Eckmann. Exh. cat. Mildred Lane Kemper Art Museum, St. Louis, MO. Ostfildern, 2007.
Amelunxen, Hubertus von. “Die Erzählung vor dem Bild.” In ars viva 2006/2007: Erzählung/Narration, Galerie Neue Meister. Exh. cat. Staatliche Kunstsammlungen Dresden, 2006, pp. 66–96.
Bischoff, Ulrich. “Gestaltete Landschaften.” In ars viva 2006/2007: Erzählung/Narration, Galerie Neue Meister.  Exh. cat. Staatliche Kunstsammlungen Dresden, 2006, pp. 97–106.
Zwischen Wirklichkeit und Bild: Positionen deutscher Fotografie der Gegenwart. Edited by Rei Masuda et al. Exh. cat. The National Museum of Modern Art. Tokyo, 2005.
Gefter, Philip. "The Picnic That Never Was." The New York Times, November 21, 2004, p. 34.
Gebbers, Anna-Catharina. "Beate Gütschow." Artist Kunstmagazin, Nr. 51 (2002), pp. 4–7.

External links
 Beate Gütschow official website
 Literature about Beate Gütschow in the database of the Deutschen Nationalbibliothek
 Beate Gütschow at Barabara Gross Galerie
 Beate Gütschow at Eric Franck Fine Art
 Beate Gütschow at Produzentengalerie Hamburg
 Beate Gütschow at Sonnabend Gallery
 NYT article The Picnic That Never Was by Philip Gefter

1970 births
Living people
Artists from Mainz
Artists from Berlin
Oslo National Academy of the Arts alumni